The  (English: Journal of Spanish Philology) is a biannual peer-reviewed academic journal of philology, dialectology, and linguistics that was established in 1914 with Ramón Menéndez Pidal as founding editor-in-chief. It is published by the Spanish National Research Council. The journal is published in Spanish, though it occasionally admits articles in other Romance languages.

The Anejos de la Revista de Filología Española (English: Annexes of the Journal of Spanish Philology) are a collection of monographs on the same subject.

Abstracting and indexing 
The journal is abstracted and indexed in Scopus, the Arts & Humanities Citation Index, and Latindex's Catalogue, among other databases.

See also
RFE Phonetic Alphabet

References

External links

Spanish-language journals
Publications established in 1914
Philology journals
Biannual journals